Geyeria is a genus of moths within the family Castniidae.

Species
Geyeria decussata (Godart, [1824])
Geyeria hubneri (Latreille, 1830)
Geyeria uruguayana (Burmeister, 1879)

References

Castniidae